Don Manuel de Mariátegui y Vinyals, 1st Count of San Bernardo (24 May 1842, in Madrid – 28 January 1905) was a Spanish noble and politician who served as Mayor of Madrid between 1892 and 1894 and as Minister of State in 1903. He married María del Rosario Pérez de Barradas, 13th Marquise of Peñaflor and had five children.

|-

Counts of Spain
Mayors of Madrid
Foreign ministers of Spain
1842 births
1905 deaths
Conservative Party (Spain) politicians